Fernie is a city in the Elk Valley area of the East Kootenay region of southeastern British Columbia, Canada, located on BC Highway 3 on the western approaches to the Crowsnest Pass through the Rocky Mountains. Founded in 1898 and incorporated as the City of Fernie in July 1904, the municipality has a population of over 5,000 with an additional 2,000 outside city limits in communities under the jurisdiction of the Regional District of East Kootenay. A substantial seasonal population swells the city during the winter months.

Fernie lies on the Elk River, along Canada's southernmost east-west transportation corridor through the Rockies that crosses the range via the Crowsnest Pass,  to the east. As the largest and longest-established community between Cranbrook and Lethbridge, Fernie serves as a minor regional centre, particularly for its fellow Elk Valley communities.

Geography

Fernie is the only city-class municipality in Canada that is fully encircled by the Rocky Mountains. The townsite was laid out in the crook of a doglegged glacial valley that today is drained by the Elk River. Three tributaries of the Elk—Coal, Lizard, and Fairy Creeks—rise in its side valleys and join the Elk either within or in close proximity to the townsite.

To the north of the city lie Mount Fernie, Mount Klauer, The Three Sisters and Mount Proctor. To the northeast is Mount Hosmer, to the east is Fernie Ridge, to the southeast is Morrissey Ridge (and its notable outcropping, Castle Mountain) and to the southwest are the various peaks of the Lizard Range. Fernie gives the name to the Jurassic-Age Fernie Formation. The Lizard Range is home to Fernie Alpine Resort, one of the largest ski resorts in Canada, and Island Lake Catskiing, a resort.

History

While the slopes of the mountains are the present focus of economic activity, until comparatively recently residents of the area were more interested in the mountains' innards. The vast Crowsnest Coal Field lies just to the east of the city, and Fernie owes its origins to nineteenth-century prospector William Fernie, who established the coal industry that continues to exist to this day. Acting on pioneer Michael Phillips' twin discoveries of coal and the Crowsnest Pass a few years earlier, Fernie founded the Crows Nest Pass Coal Company in 1897 and established a temporary encampment near Coal Creek.  The Canadian Pacific Railway arrived in the valley the following year, and a townsite emerged parallel to the railway line slightly north of the initial encampment, or "Old Town."

On May 23, 1902, a coal mine explosion killed 109 miners at the Crow's Nest Coal Mining Company.  The disaster, one of the worst mining accidents in Canadian history, is largely forgotten in Fernie and overlooked by local historians after more than a century.  During World War One, an internment camp for prisoners of war was set up at rented premises in Fernie from June 1915 to October 1918.

A variety of other mines were sunk into the coal fields in a fifty-kilometre radius in the following two decades. No mining was ever carried out in Fernie proper; coking of Coal Creek coal was carried out at the townsite, but otherwise, the town developed into an administrative and commercial centre for the burgeoning industry. Forestry played a smaller role in the local economy and a local brewery produced Fernie Beer from Brewery Creek (mountain spring water).

Like most single-industry towns, Fernie endured several boom-and-bust cycles throughout the twentieth century, generally tied to the global price of coal. The mines at Coal Creek closed permanently by 1960 and the focus of mining activity shifted to Michel and Natal about  upriver, which sat on a more productive portion of the Crowsnest Coal Field. Kaiser Resources opened immense open-pit mines there in the 1970s to meet new metallurgical coal contracts for the Asian industrial market, predominantly for use in blast furnaces. Fernie would remain an important residential base for mine labour, along with the new communities of Sparwood and Elkford that sprang up much closer to these new mines. Today, Teck Resources operates four open-pit mines, shipping out unit trains (often with more than 100 cars) along the Canadian Pacific Railway through Fernie to the Pacific Coast, where the coal is loaded onto freighters at Roberts Bank Superport in Delta.

Flathead Valley avalanches

The Flathead Valley avalanches were two avalanches that buried 11 snowmobilers near Fernie on December 28, 2008.  The avalanches ultimately claimed the lives of eight of the riders.

Architectural heritage
After a disastrous fire levelled much of the downtown core in 1904, the fledgling municipal government passed an ordinance requiring all buildings in the area to be built of 'fireproof' materials like brick and stone. Consequently, a new city centre rose from the ashes sporting brick buildings along broad avenues that would have looked more at home in a sedate and refined Victorian city than a rough-and-tumble frontier coal town. They were short-lived, however, as a second, larger inferno swept through the city on August 1, 1908. Whipped up by sudden winds, a nearby forest fire burnt its way into a lumber yard on the edge of the community and sparked a Dresden-style firestorm that melted brick and mortar and essentially erased the entire city in an afternoon. There were few casualties however and for a second time, a stately brick downtown core rose from the ashes. Today, these historic buildings, most of which still stand, are a treasured and distinctive feature of the community.

Sports
Summer in Fernie is generally far quieter than the winter months, though mountain biking, fly fishing and golf are increasingly important tourist draws.

Fernie Memorial Arena disaster
On October 17, 2017, there was an ammonia leak at the Fernie Memorial Arena which killed three workers (two City of Fernie employees and one CIMCO refrigeration employee from Calgary) during the Ghostriders' regular season. Because of this tragedy, the City of Fernie declared a state of emergency and people had to evacuate the area for days. The 'Riders were relocated because of this to the Elk Valley Leisure Centre in Sparwood, British Columbia during the 2017–18 KIJHL season until the City of Fernie decided what to do. The City of Fernie decided to replace ammonia for a synthetic refrigerant prior to the 2018–19 KIJHL season and moved the team back to the Fernie Memorial Arena.

Notable people
The following people were born, raised in or reside in Fernie:

Angie Abdou, Canadian fiction writer
Emily Brydon, retired Olympic alpine skier
Shane Churla, Stanley Cup finalist
James Gladstone, the first Status Indian to be appointed to the Senate of Canada
Ivy Granstrom, blind Canadian Masters athlete
George Wayne Haddad, Canadian politician and Fernie's past MLA
Cal Hockley, retired gold medal winning hockey player
Frank Hughes, retired NHL and WHA hockey player
Craig Kelly, professional snowboarder
Jason Krog, Stanley Cup finalist
Florence Lassandro, Italian-Canadian bootlegger
David LeNeveu, Stanley Cup finalist
Alex Lifeson, guitarist of Rush
Bill Lindsay, Stanley Cup finalist
Eric Munn, sixth Bishop of Caledonia
Emilio Picariello, Italian-Canadian bootlegger
Danielle Poleschuk, Canadian freestyle skier
Garth Rizzuto, retired NHL and WHA hockey player
William Roderick Ross, Canadian politician and Fernie's MLA
Darren Servatius, retired AAHL and ECHL defencemen
Dan Smith, retired NHL hockey player
Stanford Smith, Stanley Cup champion
Alfred Stork, Canadian politician and Fernie's past mayor and MLA
Tom Uphill, Canadian politician and Fernie's past mayor and MLA

Local media

Newspapers

 e-know - East Kootenay news online weekly
 Fernie Fix - monthly glossy magazine
 The Free Press - weekly paper

Radio stations

 107.9 FM - 2Day FM, modern adult contemporary
 103.5 FM - CJAY 92, active rock
 99.1 FM - The Drive, active rock
 97.7 FM - CBC Radio One, public news/talk
 92.7 FM - B104, country

Cable television
Shaw Communications operates a cable system serving Fernie. The cable system offers most major channels from Vancouver and Calgary, as well as local programming on Shaw TV channel 10.

Schools and colleges 
School District 5 Southeast Kootenay operates the following public schools in Fernie:
 Isabella Dicken Elementary School (Grades K-6)
 Fernie Secondary School (Grades 7-12)

The Conseil scolaire francophone de la Colombie-Britannique operates one Francophone school: école Sophie-Morigeau primary school.

Private schools:
 The Fernie Academy (Grades K-12)

Post-secondary:
 College of the Rockies

Demographics

Ethnicity

Religion 
According to the 2021 census, religious groups in Fernie included:
Irreligion (4,005 persons or 64.9%)
Christianity (2,010 persons or 32.6%)
Hinduism (65 persons or 1.1%)
Sikhism (35 persons or 0.6%)
Buddhism (20 persons or 0.3%)
Judaism (15 persons or 0.2%)
Other (20 persons or 0.3%)

Climate
Fernie has a cool and wet humid continental climate (Köppen Dfb) with warm summer days, cool summer nights along with cold and snowy winters. Influenced by chinook winds and being to the west of the continent, Fernie's winters are mild for its latitude in North America, although the climate is a lot more continental than coastal British Columbia.

See also
Coal Creek, British Columbia, The Ghost Town
Coal Creek (British Columbia), The Creek

Notes

References

External links

Cities in British Columbia
Elk Valley (British Columbia)
Populated places in the Regional District of East Kootenay